One of the uninhabited Baffin Island offshore island groups, the Lavoie Islands are located at the head of the Bernier Bay, approximately  from its opening into eastern Gulf of Boothia. The islands are part of the Qikiqtaaluk Region, in the Canadian territory of Nunavut.

References 

Archipelagoes of Baffin Island
Archipelagoes of the Canadian Arctic Archipelago
Islands of the Gulf of Boothia
Uninhabited islands of Qikiqtaaluk Region